Garden of the Plantmaster is a fantasy role-playing game adventure module.

Plot summary
Garden of the Plantmaster is a scenario set in a demonic garden in an alien world. The heroes must stop the demon who has taken control of the garden from releasing its monsters into the world. The adventure includes 20 new monsters.

Publication history
Garden of the Plantmaster was written by Robert Kuntz, and was published by Creations Unlimited, Inc., in 1987 as a 72-page book.

Garden of the Plantmaster was the last publication from Creations Unlimited, although the adventure itself was older than the Maze of Zayene series of adventures. The adventure had been developed as a special area in the original adventures Castle Greyhawk dungeons in 1974-1975, while Kuntz used it in its completed form in his Lost City of the Elders and it was also closely tied to the adventure Mordenkainen's Fantastic Adventure.

Kenzer & Company reprinted the adventure as Garden of the Plant Master in 2003.

Reception

Reviews
White Wolf #9 (1988)

References

Fantasy role-playing game adventures
Role-playing game supplements introduced in 1987